The Mährenhorn is a mountain in the Berner Alps, overlooking Innertkirchen in the Bernese Oberland. It lies west of Triftsee, near the Trift Glacier.

References

External links
Mährenhorn on Summitpost

Mountains of the Alps
Mountains of Switzerland
Mountains of the canton of Bern
Two-thousanders of Switzerland